"Predictable" is the lead single from American rock band Good Charlotte's third studio album, The Chronicles of Life and Death (2004). This was the first single released that featured Chris Wilson as the band's drummer. The song was also released in a Japanese version; in this version, only Benji Madden sings the Japanese part because he is the only one who knows Japanese.

Released on September 27, 2004, "Predictable" reached the top 20 in Australia and the United Kingdom, where it topped the UK Rock Chart for a week. The song's music video, inspired by the film Edward Scissorhands, takes place in a town drawn by the guitarist Billy Martin, with the band in a house singing the English version. The song was used for a commercial of Donkey Konga 2, and members of Good Charlotte also appear in the commercial.

Track listing
Australia single
 "Predictable"
 "The Chronicles of Life and Death" (acoustic version)
 "The Anthem" (live from the Abbey Road sessions)
 "Hold On" (live from the Abbey Road sessions)
 "Predictable" (video)

Charts

Release history

References

2004 singles
2004 songs
Daylight Records singles
Epic Records singles
Good Charlotte songs
Song recordings produced by Eric Valentine
Songs written by Benji Madden
Songs written by Joel Madden